Syrian Medical TV (Arabic القناة الطبية السورية الفضائية) was a television station based in Damascus, Syria.

References

External links
 
 
 

Arabic-language television stations
Television channels in Syria
Mass media in Damascus